

M–Mai 

 
 
 
  (1856)
 
 
 
  (//)
 
  (/)
 
 
 
 
 
  (//)
 
  (/)
  (/)
  (/)
 
 
 
 
 
 
 
  (//)
  (1884)
 
 
 
  (1863)
 
  (/)
  (/)
  (/)
 
  (/)
  (/)
  (/, /)
 
  (//)
 
 
  (/)
  (/)
 
 
 
  (/)
 
 
  (/)

Maj–Maq 

 
 
  (/)
 
 
 
  (/)
  (/)
 
 
 
 
 
 
  (/, /)
 
  (//)
 
 
  (/)
  (/)
 
  (/)
 
  (/)
  
 
 
 
  (/)
 
  (//)
 
 
  (//)
 
  (/)
 
  (1863)
  (/)
  (///)
  (//)
 
  
 
 
 
 
 
 
  (/)
 
 
 
 
 
 
  (/)
  (/)

Mar 

 
 
  (/)
  (/)
 
 
 
 
 
  (//)
 
  (/)
 
 
 
 
 
 
 
 
 
 
 
 
 
 
 
 
  (/)
 
  (//)
 
 
  (/)
 
 
  (/)
 
 
 
 
 
 
 
 
 
 
 
 
 
 
 
  (/)
  (//)
 
 
 
 
 
 
 
 
 
  (/)
 
 
 
  
 
 
 
 
 
  (/)
 
  (/)
 
 
 
 
 
 
 
 
 
 
 
 
 
  (/)

Mas–Maz 

 
  (/)
  (/)
 
 
 
  (/)
 
 
  (/)
  (/)
  (///)
  (//)
 
 
 
 
  (/)
  
 
 
  (/)
 
 
 
  (/)
 
 
 
  (/, /)
 
 
 
 
  (/)
  (//)
  (//)
 
 
 
 
 
 
 
 
 
  (//)

Mc–Mem 

 
  (/)
 
 
 
  (//)
  (/)
 
  (/)
  (/)
 
 
  (/)
 
  (/)
 
 
  (/)
 
  (/)
 
  (//)
 
 
 
 
  (/)
 
 
 
 
 
 
 
 
 
 
 
  (/)
 
 
 
 
  (//)
 
 
 
 
  (1826)
 
  (/)
  (/)
 
 
  (/)
 
 
 
 
 
 
 
 
  (/)

Men–Mey 

 
 
  (/)
 
 
 
 
 
  (/)
  (/)
 
 
 
 
  (/)
  (/)
 
 
 
 
 
 
  (/)
 
 
  (/)
  (/)
 
 
 
  (//)
 
 
 
 
 
  (/)
 
 
 
 
  (/)
 
 
  (//)
 
 
  (/)
 
 
  (/)
 
 
  (/)
 
 
 
 
 
  (/)

Mia–Min 

 
  (/, /)
 
 
 
 
 
  (/)
 
 
 
 
 
 
 
 
  (/)
 
  (/)
 
 
 
 
 
 
 
 
 
 
  (/, /)
  (/)
  (//)
  (/)
  (/)
 
 
 
  (/)
  (//)
  (/)
 
  (/)
 
 
 
 
 
  (/)
 
  (/)
 
  (/)
 
 
 
 
 
  (//)
  (/)
 
 
 
 

Mir–Miz 

 
 
 
 
  (/)
 
  (/)
 
 
 
  (///)
  (/)
  (//)
  (/)
 USNS Mission De Pala (AO-114/T-AO-114)
  (/)
  (/)
  (/)
  (/)
  (/)
  (/)
  (/)
  (/)
  (/)
  (/)
  (/)
  (/)
  (/)
  (/)
  (/)
  (/)
  (/)
  (/)
  (/)
  (/)
  (//)
  (/)
  (/)
  (/)
  (/, /)
  (/)
 
 
 
 
  (//)
  (/)
 

Moa–Mon 

 
 
 
 
  (/)
 
  (/)
 
  (/)
  (/)
  (/)
 
 
 
 
 
  (//)
 
  (/)
 
 
 
 
 
  (//, /)
 
 
 
 
 
  (///)
 
 
  (/)
  (//)
  (/)
 
  (/)
  (/)
 
 
 
 
  (//)
  (/)
 
  (//)
  (//)
 
  (/)
 
 
 
 
 
  (/)

Moo–Mou 

  (1862)
 
 
 
 
 
 
  (/)
  (/)
  (/)
  (/)
  (/)
 
 
 
 
 
 
 
 
 
  (/)
 
  
  (/)
 
 
  (/)
 
 
  (/)
 
 
 
 
 
  (/)

Mu–My 

 
 
  (/)
  (/)
  (/)
 
 
 
 
 
  (/)
 
 
 
 
 
  (/)
 
 
 
  (/, /)
  (/)
 
 
 
 
 
 
 
 
 
  (//)
  (/)
  (/)
  (/)
 
 
  (/)
  (/)
 
 
 
  (DSRV-1)

References

Primary
 Dictionary of American Naval Fighting Ships, M
  Naval Vessel Register, M

Secondary
 navy.mil: List of homeports and their ships
 NavSource Naval History